opened in Yokote, Akita Prefecture, Japan in 1994 and houses an important collection of Akita ranga .

See also

 Akita Prefectural Museum
 List of Cultural Properties of Japan - paintings (Akita)
 Yōga (art)

References

External links
  Akita Museum of Modern Art

Museums in Akita Prefecture
Yokote, Akita
Art museums and galleries in Japan
Prefectural museums
Art museums established in 1994
1994 establishments in Japan